Sufax, Syphax, Sufaqs or Sophax (Ancient Greek: Σόφακος Sophaxus) was a hero or demigod from the Berber and Greek mythologies.

Family 
According to the myth, Sufax was the son of goddess Tinjis from her second marriage to demigod Heracles, and the grandson of Zeus and mortal Alcmene. His half-sister was likely Iphinoe, and his half-brother (and possible half-nephew) was Palaemon, son of Iphinoe and Heracles.

Mythology 

Sufax replaced his mother's first husband Antaeus as a guard of the country of the Berbers (or Imazighen). He is said to be the founder of Tangier in memory to his mother.

According to the Berber mythology, many of the Berber kings are descendants of Sufax, who defended their lands. He had a son, Diodorus, who reigned over many North African Berber tribes with the help of the Olympians.
According to the ancient Greek historian Plutarch, many of the myths were created in order to give credits to the Numidian king Juba II who considered himself a descendant of Diodorus and Hercules.

Notes

References 

 Apollodorus, The Library with an English Translation by Sir James George Frazer, F.B.A., F.R.S. in 2 Volumes, Cambridge, MA, Harvard University Press; London, William Heinemann Ltd. 1921. ISBN 0-674-99135-4. Online version at the Perseus Digital Library. Greek text available from the same website.
 Gaius Julius Hyginus, Fabulae from The Myths of Hyginus translated and edited by Mary Grant. University of Kansas Publications in Humanistic Studies. Online version at the Topos Text Project.
 Hesiod, Shield of Heracles from The Homeric Hymns and Homerica with an English Translation by Hugh G. Evelyn-White, Cambridge, MA.,Harvard University Press; London, William Heinemann Ltd. 1914. Online version at the Perseus Digital Library. Greek text available from the same website.

Heracleidae
Children of Heracles
Libyan characters in Greek mythology
Characters in Berber mythology
Tangier
Mauretania
Numidia
Kings in Greek mythology
Kings in Berber mythology